Marie Joseph Gabriel Antoine Jogand-Pagès, better known by the pen name Léo Taxil (March 21, 1854 – March 31, 1907), was a French writer and journalist who became known for his strong anti-Catholic and anti-clerical views. He is also known for the Taxil hoax, a spurious exposé of Freemasonry and the Roman Catholic Church's opposition to it.

Early life
Marie Joseph Gabriel Antoine Jogand-Pagès was born in Marseille, and at the age of five, he was placed into a Jesuit seminary. After spending his childhood years in the seminary, he became disillusioned with the Catholic faith and began to see the religious ideology as socially harmful. He also wrote some  novels under the  pseudonym Prosper Manin.

La Bible amusante
Taxil first became known for writing anti-Clerical or anti-Catholic books, notably La Bible amusante (The Amusing Bible) and La Vie de Jesus (The Life of Jesus), in which Taxil satirically pointed out inconsistencies, errors, and false beliefs presented in these religious works. In his other books Les Débauches d'un confesseur (Debauchery of a Confessor, with Karl Milo), Les Pornographes sacrés: la confession et les confesseurs (Sacred Pornographs: confession and confessors), and Les Maîtresses du Pape (The Pope's Mistresses), Taxil portrays leaders of the Catholic Church as hedonistic creatures exploring their fetishes in the manner of the Marquis de Sade. In 1879, he was tried at the Seine Assizes for writing a pamphlet A Bas la Calotte ("Down with the Cloth"), which was accused of insulting a religion recognized by the state, but he was acquitted.

The Taxil hoax

In 1885, he professed conversion to Catholicism, was solemnly received into the church, and renounced his earlier works. In the 1890s, he wrote a series of pamphlets and books denouncing Freemasonry, charging their lodges with worshiping the devil and alleging that Diana Vaughan had written for him her confessions of the Satanic "Palladist" cult. The book had great sales among Catholics, although Diana Vaughan never appeared in public. In 1892, Taxil also began to publish a paper, La France chrétienne anti-maçonnique (Christian Antimasonic France), with his staunch anti-Masonic publishing friend, Abel Clarin de la Rive. In 1887, he had an audience with Pope Leo XIII, who rebuked the bishop of Charleston for denouncing the anti-Masonic confessions as a fraud and, in 1896, sent his blessing to an anti-Masonic Congress of Trent.

Doubts about Vaughan's veracity and even her existence began to grow, and finally, Taxil promised to produce her at a lecture to be delivered by him on 19 April 1897. To the amazement of the audience (which included a number of priests), he announced that Diana was one of a series of hoaxes. He had begun, he said, by persuading the commandant of Marseille that the harbor was infested with sharks, and a ship was sent to destroy them. Next, he invented an underwater city in Lake Geneva, drawing tourists and archaeologists to the spot. He thanked the bishops and Catholic newspapers for facilitating his crowning hoax, namely his conversion, which had exposed the anti-Masonic fanaticism of many Catholics. Diana Vaughan was revealed to be a simple typist in his employ, who laughingly allowed her name to be used by him.

The audience received these revelations with indignation and contempt. Afterwards, Taxil left the hall, where policemen escorted him to a neighboring café. He then moved away from Paris. He died in Sceaux in 1907 of unknown reason.

Selected books
La Vie de Jésus (The Life of Jesus) (1882)
La Bible amusante (The Amusing Bible) (1882)
Les Débauches d'un confesseur (The Debaucheries of a Confessor) (1884, with Karl Milo)
Les Pornographes sacrés: la confession et les confesseurs (The Holy Pornographers: Confession and Confessors) (1882)
Les Maîtresses du Pape (The Pope's Mistresses) (1884)
Le Martyre de Jeanne d'Arc (The Martyrdom of Joan of Arc) (1890, with Paul Fesch; edition of Pierre Cauchon's manuscripts of Joan of Arc's trial)
 Prosper Manin. Marchands de chair humaine  Dijon : E. Bernard, 1904. Petite collection E. Bernard ; n° 20. 128 p.: ll. ; in-16

See also
 Abel Clarin de la Rive

Notes

References
Satan Franc-Maçon: la mystification de Léo Taxil, 1964.

External links

A.E. Waite, Devil-Worship in France complete e-text of Waite's 1896 debunking of Taxil.

1854 births
1907 deaths
Writers from Marseille
Anti-Masonry
French atheists
Critics of the Catholic Church
French male non-fiction writers
Hoaxers
Pseudonymous writers
19th-century atheists
20th-century atheists
Former Roman Catholics
Anti-clericals